Marko Nikolić (born 20 July 1979) is a Serbian football manager.

Early life
Born in Belgrade, Nikolić joined Rad as a trainee in 1989. He played for the club at all youth levels, together with the likes of Ivica Iliev, Milan Martinović, and Nemanja Vučićević, among others. After completing his formation, Nikolić spent some time on loan with third-tier club Dorćol, before retiring from the game due to an injury.

Managerial career

Spells at Rad
In his early 20s, Nikolić worked with Rad's youth teams for many years, before being promoted to the senior squad in 2008. He served as assistant manager to both Mihailo Ivanović and Aleksandar Janjić, eventually replacing the latter one on 26 October 2008, after the club earned just five points from the opening nine fixtures. Three days later, Nikolić became the youngest manager ever in the top flight of Serbian football, recording a 1–0 win over Vojvodina. He ultimately managed to save the club from relegation that season, finishing in ninth place. On 23 May 2011, two rounds before the end of the 2010–11 season, Nikolić secured a spot in the 2011–12 UEFA Europa League, but decided to leave the club due to "achieved goals".

On 6 March 2012, Rad appointed Nikolić as manager for the second time. He signed a contract that would keep him at the club until the summer of 2013.

Vojvodina
On 7 June 2013, Nikolić was appointed manager of Vojvodina. He led the club to the play-off round in the Europa League, but lost to Sheriff Tiraspol 2–3 on aggregate. On 9 December 2013, Nikolić parted company with Vojvodina by mutual agreement.

Partizan
On 16 December 2013, Nikolić was appointed manager of Partizan, replacing Vuk Rašović. Some of his first signings included his former Vojvodina players Miroslav Vulićević, Petar Škuletić, and Branislav Trajković. On 22 February 2014, Nikolić made his debut in a goalless draw away at Novi Pazar. He eventually failed to defend the league title in the 2013–14 campaign. In the following 2014–15 season, Nikolić qualified to the group stage of the Europa League, finishing bottom of the table. He was somewhat unexpectedly released by the club on 25 March 2015, leaving Partizan in first place and reaching the cup semi-final.

Olimpija Ljubljana
On 11 January 2016, Nikolić was presented as new manager of Slovenian club Olimpija Ljubljana, penning a two-and-a-half-year contract. He rejoined his countryman Ranko Stojić, the club's director of football, as they previously performed the same roles at Rad. On 10 April 2016, in a league fixture versus Zavrč, Nikolić reportedly called his player, Blessing Eleke, a "black idiot" for elaborately celebrating an injury-time equalizer in an eventual 1–1 draw. He later apologized to the player, club's management, and fans. However, on 14 April 2016, Nikolić received a seven-match ban and was fined €1,500 by the Slovenian FA following the incident. He eventually terminated his contract with the club by mutual consent on 18 April 2016.

Return to Partizan
On 4 August 2016, Nikolić returned to Partizan on a two-year deal. His first competitive game back in charge of Partizan ended in a 1–3 home loss to Vojvodina three days later. After recording two wins and two losses in the first four matches, Nikolić ran a streak of 37 consecutive games without a loss in both the league and cup (33 wins), eventually winning the double. On 31 May 2017, Nikolić terminated his contract with Partizan upon his request.

Videoton
On 6 June 2017, Nikolić signed a two-year contract with Hungarian club Videoton. He won the Nemzeti Bajnokság I in his first season in charge.

He managed the club to reach the play-offs of the 2018–19 UEFA Champions League. However, the club was defeated by AEK Athens F.C., therefore, the cub was eligible to play in the group stages of the 2018–19 UEFA Europa League. Vidi beat PAOK FC twice and they drew with Chelsea F.C. However, in the following year Fehérvár FC was beaten by FC Vaduz in the third round of the 2019–20 UEFA Europa League.

On 25 November 2019, he was dismissed by Fehérvár FC after a 3-1 home defeat at the MOL Aréna Sóstó. The club directors expected that Fehérvár could gain more points in the first half of the 2019–20 Nemzeti Bajnokság I season than their rival Ferencváros since Ferencváros played in the 2019–20 UEFA Europa League. However, on the 12 match day Ferencváros led the championship.

Lokomotiv Moscow
On 14 May 2020, the board of directors of Russian Premier League club FC Lokomotiv Moscow announced the signing of Nikolić, with contract beginning on 1 June 2020. The Russian league was suspended until that date due to the COVID-19 pandemic in Russia. He replaced Yuri Semin. In the 2020–21 season, Lokomotiv won the Russian Cup and qualified for the Europa League, also finishing in 3rd place in the league table. On 21 May 2021, Lokomotiv extended contract with Nikolić for three additional years. He left Lokomotiv by mutual consent on 5 October 2021.

Managerial statistics

Honours

Manager
Partizan 
Serbian SuperLiga: 2016–17
Serbian Cup: 2016–17

Fehérvár 
Nemzeti Bajnokság I: 2017–18
Hungarian Cup: 2018–19

Lokomotiv Moscow 
Russian Cup: 2020–21

Individual
Serbian SuperLiga Manager of the Season: 2016–17

References

External links
 

1979 births
Living people
Sportspeople from Belgrade
Serbian footballers
Association football midfielders
FK Rad players
FK Dorćol players
Serbian football managers
FK Rad managers
FK Vojvodina managers
FK Partizan managers
NK Olimpija Ljubljana (2005) managers
Fehérvár FC managers
FC Lokomotiv Moscow managers
Serbian SuperLiga managers
Russian Premier League managers
Serbian expatriate football managers
Serbian expatriate sportspeople in Hungary
Serbian expatriate sportspeople in Slovenia
Serbian expatriate sportspeople in Russia
Expatriate football managers in Hungary
Expatriate football managers in Slovenia
Expatriate football managers in Russia
Nemzeti Bajnokság I managers